Pygmalion is a play by Irish playwright George Bernard Shaw, named after the Greek mythological figure. It premiered at the Hofburg Theatre in Vienna on 16 October 1913 and was first presented in German on stage to the public in 1913. Its English-language premiere took place at Her Majesty's Theatre in the West End in April 1914 and starred Herbert Beerbohm Tree as phonetics professor Henry Higgins and Mrs Patrick Campbell as Cockney flower girl Eliza Doolittle.

Shaw's play has been adapted numerous times, most notably as the 1938 film Pygmalion, the 1956 musical My Fair Lady and its 1964 film version.

Inspiration

In ancient Greek mythology, Pygmalion fell in love with one of his sculptures, which then came to life. The general idea of that myth was a popular subject for Victorian era British playwrights, including one of Shaw's influences, W. S. Gilbert, who wrote a successful play based on the story called Pygmalion and Galatea that was first presented in 1871. Shaw would also have been familiar with the musical Adonis and the burlesque version, Galatea, or Pygmalion Reversed. 

Shaw mentioned that the character of Professor Henry Higgins was inspired by several British professors of phonetics: Alexander Melville Bell, Alexander J. Ellis, Tito Pagliardini, but above all, the cantankerous Henry Sweet.

First productions 

Shaw wrote the play in early 1912 and read it to famed actress Mrs. Patrick Campbell in June. She came on board almost immediately, but her mild nervous breakdown contributed to the delay of a London production. Pygmalion premiered at the Hofburg Theatre in Vienna on 16 October 1913, in a German translation by Shaw's Viennese literary agent and acolyte, Siegfried Trebitsch.
Its first New York production opened on 24 March 1914 at the German-language Irving Place Theatre.
It opened in London on 11 April 1914, at Sir Herbert Beerbohm Tree's His Majesty's Theatre, with Campbell as Eliza and Tree as Higgins, and ran for 118 performances.
Shaw directed the actors through tempestuous rehearsals often punctuated by at least one of the two storming out of the theatre in a rage.

Plot

Act One 

A group of people are sheltering from the rain. Among them are the Eynsford-Hills, superficial social climbers eking out a living in "genteel poverty", consisting initially of Mrs Eynsford-Hill and her daughter Clara. Clara's brother Freddy enters having earlier been dispatched to secure them a cab (which they can ill-afford), but being rather timid and faint-hearted he has failed to do so. As he goes off once again to find a cab, he bumps into a flower girl, Eliza Doolittle. Her flowers drop into the mud of Covent Garden, the flowers she needs to survive in her poverty-stricken world. Shortly they are joined by a gentleman, Colonel Pickering. While Eliza tries to sell flowers to the Colonel, a bystander informs her that a man is writing down everything she says. The man is Henry Higgins, a linguist. Eliza worries that Higgins is a police officer and will not calm down until Higgins introduces himself. It soon becomes apparent that he and Colonel Pickering have a shared interest in phonetics and an intense mutual admiration; indeed, Pickering has come from India to meet Higgins, and Higgins was planning to go to India to meet Pickering. Higgins tells Pickering that he could pass off the flower girl as a duchess merely by teaching her to speak properly. These words of bravado spark an interest in Eliza, who would love to make changes in her life and become more mannerly, even though to her it only means working in a flower shop. At the end of the act, Freddy returns after finding a taxi, only to find that his mother and sister have gone and left him with the cab. The streetwise Eliza takes the cab from him, using the money that Higgins tossed to her, leaving him on his own.

Act Two 

Higgins' home – the next day

As Higgins demonstrates his phonetics to Pickering, the housekeeper Mrs Pearce tells him that a young girl wants to see him. Eliza has shown up because she wishes to talk like a lady in a flower shop. She tells Higgins that she will pay for lessons. He shows no interest, but she reminds him of his boast the previous day. Higgins claimed that he could pass her for a duchess. Pickering makes a bet with him on his claim and says that he will pay for her lessons if Higgins succeeds. She is sent off to have a bath. Mrs Pearce tells Higgins that he must behave himself in the young girl's presence, meaning he must stop swearing and improve his table manners, but he is at a loss to understand why she should find fault with him. Alfred Doolittle, Eliza's father, appears with the sole purpose of getting money out of Higgins, having no paternal interest in his daughter's welfare. He requests and received five pounds in compensation of the loss of Eliza, although Higgins, much amused by Doolittle's approach to morality, is tempted to pay ten.  Doolittle refuses; he sees himself as a member of the undeserving poor, and means to go on being undeserving. With his intelligent mind untamed by education, he has an eccentric view of life. He is also aggressive, and when Eliza, on her return, sticks her tongue out at him, he goes to hit her, but Pickering prevents him. The scene ends with Higgins telling Pickering that they really have got a difficult job on their hands.

Act Three
Mrs. Higgins' drawing room

Higgins bursts in and tells his mother he has picked up a "common flower girl" whom he has been teaching. Mrs Higgins is unimpressed with her son's attempts to win her approval because it is her 'at home' day and she is entertaining visitors. The visitors are the Eynsford-Hills. Higgins is rude to them on their arrival. Eliza enters and soon falls into talking about the weather and her family. Whilst she is now able to speak in beautifully modulated tones, the substance of what she says remains unchanged from the gutter. She confides her suspicions that her aunt was killed by relatives, mentions that gin had been "mother's milk" to this aunt, and that Eliza's own father was always more cheerful after a goodly amount of gin. Higgins passes off her remarks as "the new small talk", and Freddy is enraptured by Eliza. When she is leaving, he asks her if she is going to walk across the park, to which she replies, "Walk? Not bloody likely!" (This is the most famous line from the play and, for many years after the play's debut, use of the word 'bloody' was known as a pygmalion; Mrs Campbell was considered to have risked her career by speaking the line on stage.) After she and the Eynsford-Hills leave, Henry asks for his mother's opinion. She says the girl is not presentable and is  concerned about what will happen to her, but neither Higgins nor Pickering understands her thoughts of Eliza's future, and leave feeling confident and excited about how Eliza will get on. This leaves Mrs Higgins feeling exasperated, and exclaiming, "Men! Men!! Men!!!"

Act Four
Higgins' home – midnight

Higgins, Pickering, and Eliza have returned from a ball. A tired Eliza sits unnoticed, brooding and silent, while Pickering congratulates Higgins on winning the bet. Higgins scoffs and declares the evening a "silly tomfoolery", thanking God it's over and saying that he had been sick of the whole thing for the last two months. Still barely acknowledging Eliza beyond asking her to leave a note for Mrs Pearce regarding coffee, the two retire to bed. Higgins returns to the room, looking for his slippers, and Eliza throws them at him. Higgins is taken aback, and is at first completely unable to understand Eliza's preoccupation, which aside from being ignored after her triumph is the question of what she is to do now. When Higgins does understand he makes light of it, saying she could get married, but Eliza interprets this as selling herself like a prostitute. "We were above that at the corner of Tottenham Court Road." Finally she returns her jewelry to Higgins, including the ring he had given her, which he throws into the fireplace with a violence that scares Eliza. Furious with himself for losing his temper, he damns Mrs Pearce, the coffee, Eliza, and finally himself, for "lavishing" his knowledge and his "regard and intimacy" on a "heartless guttersnipe", and retires in great dudgeon. Eliza roots around in the fireplace and retrieves the ring.

Act Five
Mrs. Higgins' drawing room – the next morning

Higgins and Pickering, perturbed by the discovery that Eliza has walked out on them, call on Mrs Higgins to phone the police. Higgins is particularly distracted, since Eliza had assumed the responsibility of maintaining his diary and keeping track of his possessions, which causes Mrs Higgins to decry their calling the police as though Eliza were "a lost umbrella". Doolittle is announced; he emerges dressed in splendid wedding attire and is furious with Higgins, who after their previous encounter had been so taken with Doolittle's unorthodox ethics that he had recommended him as the "most original moralist in England" to a rich American founding Moral Reform Societies; the American had subsequently left Doolittle a pension worth three thousand pounds a year, as a consequence of which Doolittle feels intimidated into joining the middle class and marrying his missus. Mrs Higgins observes that this at least settles the problem of who shall provide for Eliza, to which Higgins objects – after all, he paid Doolittle five pounds for her. Mrs Higgins informs her son that Eliza is upstairs, and explains the circumstances of her arrival, alluding to how marginalised and overlooked Eliza felt the previous night. Higgins is unable to appreciate this, and sulks when told that he must behave if Eliza is to join them. Doolittle is asked to wait outside.

Eliza enters, at ease and self-possessed. Higgins blusters but Eliza is unshaken and speaks exclusively to Pickering. Throwing Higgins' previous insults back at him ("Oh, I'm only a squashed cabbage leaf"), Eliza remarks that it was only by Pickering's example that she learned to be a lady, which renders Higgins speechless. Eliza goes on to say that she has completely left behind the flower girl she was, and that she couldn't utter any of her old sounds if she tried – at which point Doolittle emerges from the balcony, causing Eliza to relapse into her gutter speech. Higgins is jubilant, jumping up and crowing over her. Doolittle explains his situation and asks if Eliza will come with him to his wedding. Pickering and Mrs Higgins also agree to go, and leave with Doolittle and Eliza to follow.

The scene ends with another confrontation between Higgins and Eliza. Higgins asks if Eliza is satisfied with the revenge she has brought thus far and if she will now come back, but she refuses. Higgins defends himself from Eliza's earlier accusation by arguing that he treats everyone the same, so she shouldn't feel singled out. Eliza replies that she just wants a little kindness, and that since he will never stoop to show her this, she will not come back, but will marry Freddy. Higgins scolds her for such low ambitions: he has made her "a consort for a king." When she threatens to teach phonetics and offer herself as an assistant to Higgins' academic rival Nepommuck, Higgins again loses his temper and vows to wring her neck if she does so. Eliza realises that this last threat strikes Higgins at the very core and that it gives her power over him; Higgins, for his part, is delighted to see a spark of fight in Eliza rather than her erstwhile fretting and worrying. He remarks "I like you like this", and calls her a "pillar of strength". Mrs Higgins returns and she and Eliza depart for the wedding. As they leave, Higgins incorrigibly gives Eliza a list of errands to run, as though their recent conversation had not taken place. Eliza disdainfully explains why they are unnecessary and wonders what Higgins shall do without her (in another version, Eliza disdainfully tells him to do the errands himself; Mrs Higgins says that she'll get the items, but Higgins cheerfully tells her that Eliza will do it after all). Higgins laughs to himself at the idea of Eliza marrying Freddy as the play ends.

Critical reception
The play was well received by critics in major cities following its premieres in Vienna, London, and New York.  The initial release in Vienna garnered several reviews describing the show as a positive departure from Shaw's usual dry and didactic style.  The Broadway premiere in New York was praised in terms of both plot and acting, described as "a love story with brusque diffidence and a wealth of humor."  Reviews of the production in London were slightly less unequivocally positive, with The Telegraph noting that the play was deeply diverting with interesting mechanical staging, although the critic ultimately found the production somewhat shallow and overly lengthy. The Times, however, praised both the characters and actors (especially Sir Herbert Tree as Higgins and Mrs. Patrick Campbell as Eliza) and the happy if "unconventional" ending.

Ending
Pygmalion was the most broadly appealing of all Shaw's plays. But popular audiences, looking for pleasant entertainment with big stars in a West End venue, wanted a "happy ending" for the characters they liked so well, as did some critics. During the 1914 run, Tree sought to sweeten Shaw's ending to please himself and his record houses. Shaw remained sufficiently irritated to add a postscript essay, "'What Happened Afterwards", to the 1916 print edition for inclusion with subsequent editions, in which he explained precisely why it was impossible for the story to end with Higgins and Eliza getting married.

He continued to protect what he saw as the play's, and Eliza's, integrity by protecting the last scene. For at least some performances during the 1920 revival, Shaw adjusted the ending in a way that underscored the Shavian message. In an undated note to Mrs. Campbell he wrote,
When Eliza emancipates herself – when Galatea comes to life – she must not relapse. She must retain her pride and triumph to the end. When Higgins takes your arm on 'consort battleship' you must instantly throw him off with implacable pride; and this is the note until the final 'Buy them yourself.' He will go out on the balcony to watch your departure; come back triumphantly into the room; exclaim 'Galatea!' (meaning that the statue has come to life at last); and – curtain. Thus he gets the last word; and you get it too.

(This ending, however, is not included in any print version of the play.)

Shaw fought against a Higgins-Eliza happy-end pairing as late as 1938. He sent the 1938 film version's producer, Gabriel Pascal, a concluding sequence which he felt offered a fair compromise: a tender farewell scene between Higgins and Eliza, followed by one showing Freddy and Eliza happy in their greengrocery-flower shop. Only at the sneak preview did he learn that Pascal had finessed the question of Eliza's future with a slightly ambiguous final scene in which Eliza returns to the house of a sadly musing Higgins and self-mockingly quotes her previous self announcing, "I washed my face and hands before I come, I did".

Different versions

There are two main versions of the play in circulation. One is based on the earlier version, first published in 1914; the other is a later version that includes several sequences revised by Shaw, first published in 1941. Therefore, different editions of the play omit or add certain lines. For instance, the Project Gutenberg version published online, which is transcribed from an early version, does not include Eliza's exchange with Mrs Pearce in Act II, the scene with Nepommuck in Act III, or Higgins' famous declaration to Eliza, "Yes, you squashed cabbage-leaf, you disgrace to the noble architecture of these columns, you incarnate insult to the English language! I could pass you off as the Queen of Sheba!" – a line so famous that it is now retained in nearly all productions of the play, including the 1938 film version of Pygmalion as well as in the stage and film versions of My Fair Lady.

The co-director of the 1938 film, Anthony Asquith, had seen Mrs Campbell in the 1920 revival of Pygmalion and noticed that she spoke the line, "It's my belief as how they done the old woman in." He knew "as how" was not in Shaw's text, but he felt it added color and rhythm to Eliza's speech, and liked to think that Mrs Campbell had ad libbed it herself. Eighteen years later he added it to Wendy Hiller's line in the film.

In the original play Eliza's test is met at an ambassador's garden party, offstage. For the 1938 film Shaw and co-writers replaced that exposition with a scene at an embassy ball; Nepommuck, the blackmailing translator spoken about in the play, is finally seen, but his name is updated to Aristid Karpathy – named so by Gabriel Pascal, the film's Hungarian producer, who also made sure that Karpathy mistakes Eliza for a Hungarian princess. In My Fair Lady he became Zoltan Karpathy. (The change of name was likely to avoid offending the sensibilities of Roman Catholics, as St. John Nepomuk was, ironically, a Catholic martyr who refused to divulge the secrets of the confessional.)

The 1938 film also introduced the famous pronunciation exercises "the rain in Spain stays mainly in the plains" and "In Hertford, Hereford, and Hampshire, hurricanes hardly ever happen". Neither of these appears in the original play. Shaw's screen version of the play as well as a new print version incorporating the new sequences he had added for the film script were published in 1941. Many of the scenes that were written for the films were separated by asterisks, and explained in a "Note for Technicians" section.

Influence
Pygmalion remains Shaw's most popular play. The play's widest audiences know it as the inspiration for the highly romanticized 1956 musical and 1964 film My Fair Lady.

Pygmalion has transcended cultural and language barriers since its first production. The British Museum contains "images of the Polish production...; a series of shots of a wonderfully Gallicised Higgins and Eliza in the first French production in Paris in 1923; a fascinating set for a Russian production of the 1930s. There was no country which didn't have its own 'take' on the subjects of class division and social mobility, and it's as enjoyable to view these subtle differences in settings and costumes as it is to imagine translators wracking their brains for their own equivalent of 'Not bloody likely'."

Joseph Weizenbaum named his chatterbot computer program ELIZA after the character Eliza Doolittle.

Notable productions

1914: Sir Herbert Beerbohm Tree and Mrs Patrick Campbell at His Majesty's Theatre
1914: Philip Merivale and Mrs Patrick Campbell at three Broadway theatres [Park, Liberty and Wallack's]
1920: C. Aubrey Smith and Mrs Patrick Campbell at the Aldwych Theatre
1926: Reginald Mason and Lynn Fontanne at the Guild Theatre (USA)
1936: Ernest Thesiger and Wendy Hiller at the Festival Theatre, Malvern
1937: Robert Morley and Diana Wynyard at the Old Vic Theatre
1945: Raymond Massey and Gertrude Lawrence at the Ethel Barrymore Theatre (USA)
1947: Alec Clunes and Brenda Bruce at the Lyric Theatre, Hammersmith
1953: John Clements and Kay Hammond at the St James's Theatre
1965: Ian White and Jane Asher at the Watford Palace Theatre
1974: Alec McCowen and Diana Rigg at the Albery Theatre
1984: Peter O'Toole and Jackie Smith-Wood at the Shaftesbury Theatre
1987: Peter O'Toole and Amanda Plummer at the Plymouth Theatre (USA)
1992: Alan Howard and Frances Barber at the Royal National Theatre
1997: Roy Marsden and Carli Norris (who replaced Emily Lloyd early in rehearsals) at the Albery Theatre
2007: Tim Pigott-Smith and Michelle Dockery at the Old Vic Theatre
2007: Jefferson Mays and Claire Danes at American Airlines Theatre (USA)
2010: Simon Robson and Cush Jumbo at the Royal Exchange Theatre, Manchester
2011: Rupert Everett (later Alistair McGowan) and Kara Tointon at the Garrick Theatre
2011: Risteárd Cooper and Charlie Murphy at the Abbey Theatre, Dublin

Adaptations

Stage
 My Fair Lady (1956), the Broadway musical by Lerner and Loewe (based on the 1938 film), starring Rex Harrison as Higgins and Julie Andrews as Eliza
Film
 Pygmalion (1935), a German film adaptation by Shaw and others, starring Gustaf Gründgens as Higgins and Jenny Jugo as Eliza. Directed by Erich Engel.
Hoi Polloi (1935), a short feature starring The Three Stooges comedy team. To win a bet, a professor attempts to transform the Stooges into gentlemen.
 Pygmalion (1937), a Dutch film adaptation, starring Johan De Meester as Higgins and Lily Bouwmeester as Elisa. Directed by Ludwig Berger.
 Pygmalion (1938), a British film adaptation by Shaw and others, starring Leslie Howard as Higgins and Wendy Hiller as Eliza
 Kitty (1945), a film based on the novel of the same name by Rosamond Marshall (published in 1943). A broad interpretation of the Pygmalion story line, the film tells the rags-to-riches story of a young guttersnipe, Cockney girl.
 My Fair Lady (1964), a film version of the musical starring Audrey Hepburn as Eliza and Rex Harrison as Higgins
 The Opening of Misty Beethoven (1976), an American hardcore pornography film take-off starring Constance Money and Jamie Gillis
 She's All That (1999): a modern, teenage take on Pygmalion
 The Duff (2015): based on the novel of the same name by Kody Keplinger, which in turn is a modern teenage adaption of Pygmalion
 He's All That (2021): a Netflix Original movie that’s a gender-swap retelling of the 1999 teen comedy; featuring Addison Rae and Rachael Leigh Cook 

Television
 A 1948 BBC TV version starring Margaret Lockwood as Eliza and Ralph Michael as Higgins
 A 1963 Hallmark Hall of Fame production of Pygmalion, starring Julie Harris as Eliza and James Donald as Higgins
 Pigmalião 70, a 1970 Brazilian telenovela, starring Sérgio Cardoso and Tônia Carrero
 Pygmalion (1973), a BBC Play of the Month version starring James Villiers as Higgins and Lynn Redgrave as Eliza
 Pygmalion (1981), a film version starring Twiggy as Eliza and Robert Powell as Higgins
 Pygmalion (1983), an adaptation starring Peter O'Toole as Higgins and Margot Kidder as Eliza
 The Makeover, a 2013 Hallmark Hall of Fame modern adaptation of Pygmalion, starring Julia Stiles and David Walton and directed by John Gray
 Selfie, a 2014 television sitcom on ABC, starring Karen Gillan and John Cho
 Classic Alice, a webseries, aired a 10-episode adaptation on YouTube, starring Kate Hackett and Tony Noto in 2014
 Totalmente Demais, a 2015 Brazilian telenovela, starring Juliana Paes, Marina Ruy Barbosa and Fábio Assunção

The BBC has broadcast radio adaptations at least twice, in 1986 directed by John Tydeman and in 2021 directed by Emma Harding.

Non–English language
 Pigmalió, an adaptation by Joan Oliver into Catalan. Set in 1950s Barcelona, it was first staged in Sabadell in 1957 and has had other stagings since.
 Ti Phulrani, an adaptation by Pu La Deshpande in Marathi. The plot follows Pygmalion closely but the language features are based on Marathi.
 Santu Rangeeli, an adaptation by Madhu Rye and Pravin Joshi in Gujarati.
  A 1996 television play in Polish, translated by Kazimierz Piotrowski, directed by Maciej Wojtyszko and performed at Teatr Telewizji (Polish Television studio in Warsaw) by some of the top Polish actors at the time. It has been aired on national TV numerous times since its TV premiere in 1998.
  A 2007 adaptation by Aka Morchiladze and Levan Tsuladze in Georgian performed at the Marjanishvili Theatre in Tbilisi
 Man Pasand, a 1980 Hindi movie directed by Basu Chatterjee
 Ogo Bodhu Shundori, a 1981 Bengali comedy film starring Uttam Kumar directed by Salil Dutta
 My Young Auntie, a 1981 Hong Kong action film directed by Lau Kar-Leung
 Laiza Porko Sushi, a Papiamentu adaptation from writer and artist May Henriquez
 Gönülcelen, a Turkish series starring Tuba Büyüküstün and Cansel Elcin
 Δύο Ξένοι, a Greek series starring Nikos Sergianopoulos and Evelina Papoulia

In popular culture

Films
 The First Night of Pygmalion (1972), a play depicting the backstage tensions during the first British production.
 Willy Russell's 1980 stage comedy Educating Rita and the subsequent film adaptation are similar in plot to Pygmalion.
 Trading Places (1983), a film starring Eddie Murphy and Dan Aykroyd.
 Pretty Woman (1990), a film starring Julia Roberts and Richard Gere.
 Mighty Aphrodite (1995) a film directed by Woody Allen.
 She's All That (1999), a film starring Rachael Leigh Cook and Freddie Prinze Jr.
 Confessions of a Teenage Drama Queen (2004), a film starring Lindsay Lohan where she auditions for a modernized musical version of Pygmalion called "Eliza Rocks".
 Ruby Sparks (2012), a film written by and starring Zoe Kazan explores a writer (played by Paul Dano) who falls in love with his own fictional character who becomes real.

Television
 Moonlightings second-season episode "My Fair David" (1985) is inspired by the movie My Fair Lady, in a plot where Maddie Hayes makes a bet with David Addison consisting in making him softer and more serious with work. She is her Henry Higgins, while he is put in the Eliza Doolittle position, as the funny, clumsy, bad-mannered part of the relationship.
 The Man from U.N.C.L.E.s third-season episode "The Galatea Affair" (1966) is a spoof of My Fair Lady. A crude barroom entertainer (Joan Collins) is taught to behave like a lady. Noel Harrison, son of Rex Harrison, star of the My Fair Lady film, is the guest star.
 In The Beverly Hillbillies episode "Pygmalion and Elly", Sonny resumes his high-class courtship of Elly May by playing Julius Caesar and Pygmalion.
In The Andy Griffith Show season 4 episode "My Fair Ernest T. Bass", Andy and Barney attempt to turn the mannerless Ernest T. Bass into a presentable gentleman. References to Pygmalion abound: Bass' manners are tested at a social gathering, where he is assumed by the hostess to be a man from Boston. Several characters comment "if you wrote this into a play nobody'd believe it."
 In Doctor Who, the character of Leela is loosely based on Eliza Doolittle. She was a regular in the programme from 1977 to 1978, and later reprised in audio dramas from 2003 to present. In Ghost Light, the character of Control is heavily based upon Eliza Doolittle, with Redvers Fenn-Cooper in a similar role as Henry Higgins; the story also features reference to the "Rain in Spain" rhyme and the Doctor referring to companion Ace as "Eliza".
 In the Remington Steele season 2 episode "My Fair Steele", Laura and Steele transform a truck stop waitress into a socialite to flush out a kidnapper. Steele references the 1938 movie Pygmalion and My Fair Lady, and references the way in which Laura has "molded" him into her fictional creation.
 In the Magnum, P.I. episode "Professor Jonathan Higgins" of Season 5, Jonathan Higgins tries to turn his punk rocker cousin into a high society socialite. Higgins references Pygmalion in the episode.
 The Simpsons episode titled "Pygmoelian" is inspired by Pygmalion, in which ugly barman Moe Szyslak has a facelift. It was also parodied to a heavier extent in the episode "My Fair Laddy", where the character being changed is uncouth Scotsman Groundskeeper Willie, with Lisa Simpson taking the Henry Higgins role.
 The Family Guy episode "One If By Clam, Two If By Sea" involves a subplot with Stewie trying to refine Eliza Pinchley, his new Cockney-accented neighbor, into a proper young lady.  He makes a bet with Brian that he can improve Eliza's vocabulary and get her to speak without her accent before her birthday party. Includes "The Life of the Wife", a parody of the song "The Rain in Spain" (from My Fair Lady). The voice of Stewie was in fact originally based on that of Rex Harrison.
 The plot of the Star Trek: Voyager episode "Someone to Watch Over Me" is loosely based on Pygmalion, with the ship's holographic doctor playing the role of Higgins to the ex-Borg Seven of Nine.
 In the Boy Meets World episode "Turnaround", Cory and Shawn learn about Pygmalion in class, paralleling their attempt with Cory's uncool date to the dance. 
 The iCarly episode "iMake Sam Girlier" is loosely based on Pygmalion.
 The Season 7 King of the Hill episode "Pigmalian" describes an unhinged local pig magnate who attempts to transform Luanne into the idealized woman of his company's old advertisements.
 In The King of Queens episode "Gambling N'Diction", Carrie tries to lose her accent for a job promotion by being taught by Spence. The episode was renamed to "Carrie Doolittle" in Germany.
 In 2014, ABC debuted a romantic situational comedy titled Selfie, starring Karen Gillan and John Cho. It is a modern-day adaptation that revolves around an image-obsessed woman named Eliza Dooley (Gillan) who comes under the social guidance of marketing image guru Henry Higgs (Cho).
 In the Malaysian drama Nur, Pygmalion themes are evident. The lives of a pious, upstanding man and a sex worker are considered within the context of Islam, societal expectations and norms.
 In Will & Grace season 5, a 4-episode arc entitled "Fagmalion" has Will and Jack take on the project of turning unkempt Barry, a newly out gay man, into a proper member of gay society.

References

External links

 
 
 Pygmalion stories & art: "successive retellings of the Pygmalion story after Ovid's Metamorphoses"
 
 
Shaw's Pygmalion was in a different class 2014 Irish Examiner article by Dr. R. Hume
 "Bernard Shaw Snubs England and Amuses Germany." The New York Times, 30 November 1913. This article quotes the original script at length ("translated into the vilest American": Letters to Trebitsch, p. 170), including its final lines. Its author, too, hopes for a "happy ending": that after the curtain Eliza will return bearing the gloves and tie.

1913 plays
West End plays
Plays by George Bernard Shaw
Works originally published in Everybody's Magazine
Literature first published in serial form
Plays set in London
British plays adapted into films